KYNM-CD, virtual and UHF digital channel 21, is a low-powered, Class A television station licensed to Albuquerque, New Mexico, United States. The station is owned by Belmax Broadcasting.

History

From 1991 to 1999, the station was a low powered repeater for KCHF-TV (channel 11), a religious television station based in Santa Fe as K61EQ on channel 61. The channel began to show programming independently as KYNM-LP in 1999 as a Christian music video outlet on channel 61 branding itself as "YTV" (Your music television). It moved to channel 30 in 2004, but eventually dropped YTV for Almavision, a Spanish-language religious network. In 2008, it was again simulcasting KCHF channel 11 until February 1, 2011, when it began airing programming from My Family TV, which still featured a few religious programs but aired mostly secular general audience programs. On April 1, 2011, it added a second digital channel airing programming from the Tuff TV network. On September 27, 2011, KYNM became the second station after KSMI-LP in Wichita, Kansas to carry the newly launched PBJ network, which featured mostly classic children's programs both live action and animated. On May 3, 2012, the full My Family TV schedule had moved to channel 30.3 with PBJ moving to 30.4, as the main channel on 30.1 had been featuring more local programming. WeatherNation was added in early August 2012 on channel 30.6. QVC was added on March 3, 2013 to channel 30.5. At the beginning of 2014, KYNM became the Albuquerque affiliate of MundoFox, the Spanish-language network from Fox and RCN Colombia, on digital channel 30.1 in high definition. WeatherNation and rebroadcasts from KCHF and KDAZ radio were dropped from the signal to provide the necessary bandwidth for HD broadcasts (they were later added to KNMQ-LD, channel 43). On July 1, 2014, Retro TV replaced My Family TV (which was renamed The Family Channel in February) on digital channel 30.3. KYNM began operating on channel 21 on July 7, 2015. On July 22, 2015, PBJ was replaced with the automotive channel Rev'n. Since late December 2015, KYNM has aired Antenna TV on channel 21.6, however Antenna TV was also shown on KNMQ-LD and KCHF. By early June 2016 Antenna TV was deleted while QVC moved to KNMQ and KCHF while also adding QVC Plus. WeatherNation meanwhile returned to KYNM on channel 21.5.

In the Fall of 2016, RCN Colombia announced the closure of MundoMax on November 30, 2016. Reasons cited were poor ratings and the loss of several affiliates as well as a lack of interest in Colombian programming among Hispanic audiences in the United States. Fox had pulled its share out of the network in 2015 and was renamed MundoMax. KYNM had changed the programming on the main channel to a relay of Antenna TV on November 28, 2016. Antenna TV has been available on KCHF 11.2 and KNMQ-LD 43.1 since August 2014. The switch however caused Comcast to drop Antenna TV in favor of MeTV already available.

In September 2019, the parent company of Antenna TV, Tribune Media, was acquired by Nexstar. In early 2020, Antenna TV was moved to MyNetworkTV affiliate KASY-TV (channel 50) on its fifth subchannel which is managed by Nexstar. KYNM has then moved the other channels up to the next channel in line.

The Family Channel returned in 2020 on KNMQ-LD 20.1 replacing Antenna TV on that channel. In summer 2021 it moved back to KYNM on channel 21.4 while the KCHF relay would move to 21.5 as KNMQ-LD would launch a new local sports channel in September.

In early 2022 the station has seen a few bungled line-up changes with Retro TV and Rev'n dropped at the end of 2021 while The Family Channel had been shown off-and-on the main channel with satellite feed problems. NTD had also been added at the beginning of the year on channel 21.3. It was previously shown on KWPL-LD channel 45.1.

On March 28, 2022, KYNM launched "The Southwest Channel" on 21.1 featuring programming about local culture.

Programming
KYNM has also showcased local programming such as "New Mexico Rides" a half-hour show about cars and other forms of transportation which aired on both digital channels 30.1 and 30.2. Also featured is "The After After Party" a local entertainment talk show hosted by local comedian Steven Michael Quezada with music from funk band The James Douglas Show. The program initially airs Saturdays on CW affiliate KWBQ (channel 19) but re-airings are shown mostly on Tuff TV 30.2 on weeknights. Channel 30.1 also features tourist information from around the state that airs weekday mornings as well as other local information. Beginning in January 2012, KYNM started airing local high school sports programming from ProView Networks on channels 30.1 and 30.2. The JENNi20 Countdown aired on KYNM from January to June 2012, but is now available on uTV Comcast Channel 26 Saturday from 4pm to 6pm. The JENNi20 Countdown was hosted by 15-year-old, Jennifer Smart, the youngest radio station owner in the US at the time when she owned KALY-AM 1240 (now KDSK).

In 2016, KYNM has begun to feature two minute coverage of local events during commercial breaks on the English language channels hosted by Dana Childs a longtime local radio personality.

Digital channels
The station's digital signal is multiplexed:

In early September 2010, the station began broadcasting in digital on channel 51. KYNM continued to broadcast on analog channel 30 but by 2012 it would have frequent periods off the air occasionally returning to the air at reduced power.

In 2013 a construction permit was granted by the FCC to move KYNM-LD to channel 21 from channel 51, which the FCC plans to eliminate for television usage as well as upgrading to a Class A television station and eliminating the analog signal. KYNM-CD was licensed for digital operation on channel 21 on June 3, 2015. At this time KYNM would begin testing its broadcast signal on channel 21 with audio from KDAZ radio until July 7 when it would begin airing the KYNM channel line-up. KYNM was still using channel 51 displayed as channel 30 with crawls on screen informing viewers the station is now on channel 21 until the signal was turned off in early August.

References

External links

YNM-CD
Television channels and stations established in 1991
Mass media in Albuquerque, New Mexico
Low-power television stations in the United States
1991 establishments in New Mexico